Citizen Soldier is a television program produced by the Pritzker Military Museum & Library.  It airs on PBS channel WTTW. Each 26 minute episode of Citizen Soldier explores topics on military history, affairs and policy through interviews and panel discussions with scholars, military personnel, and authors. From exploring the military necessity of the Emancipation Proclamation with James McPherson to an alternative history of the Battle of Midway during World War II, this series seeks to educate the public about important aspects of history and policy.

Production 
Citizen Soldier is created by Pritzker Military Museum and Library as part of the Library's mission to develop appropriate programs focusing on the Citizen Soldier in the preservation of democracy.

Series overview 

Two episodes from the second season won Telly Awards. The fourth episode, "The Tuskegee Airmen Of World War II" won in the Online Video category and the ninth episode, "The Next Battlefield: On Cyber War" received its prize in the Film & Video category.

Episode List

Season 1

Season 2

Resources

External links
 Pritzker Military Museum and Library

PBS original programming
2013 American television series debuts
2010s American documentary television series
Chicago television shows